Blotto is a 1930 American pre-Code comedy film directed by James Parrott and starring Stan Laurel and Oliver Hardy. The short was produced by Hal Roach and originally distributed by Metro-Goldwyn-Mayer.

The name of the film relates to the now archaic term "to be blotto" meaning to be very drunk.

Plot

Set during the Prohibition era, Laurel and Hardy make plans to spend a wild night out at the Rainbow Club.

Stan is at home, itching to go out, while his wife nags his every movement. Phoning Stan at home, Ollie at first continually gets Stan saying "wrong number" because his wife is watching. He then suggests a ruse by which Stan is to convince his wife, who keeps him on a short leash, that he has been called away on business. Stan readily agrees to the idea, assuring Ollie that his wife is "so dumb she'll never know the difference".

Mrs. Laurel, eavesdropping on a second line in the bedroom, is furious, but continues listening as Stan tells Ollie that he knows where he can get some liquor. His plan is to steal the bottle that his wife has hidden in the house, and later blame the loss on the iceman. Mrs. Laurel immediately launches a scheme of her own: she replaces the alcohol with tea, laced with salt, pepper, cayenne and tabasco.

Stan and Ollie try in vain to open their own bottle quietly in the club. They then proceed to get "drunk" at the nightclub and are enjoying themselves watching the acts including an exotic dancer in the style of Josephine Baker. A baritone singer's rendition of "Curse of an Aching Heart" is so sad it makes Stan cry.

Meanwhile Mrs. Laurel has bought a double-barreled shotgun and she angrily arrives at the club with the gun wrapped in paper. After revealing to them that their "liquor" is actually just cold tea, she chases them into the street, where the boys jump into a taxi cab to escape. Mrs. Laurel then completely demolishes the fleeing cab with one well-aimed blast from her gun.

Cast

Production
The film originally had no music except for the orchestral version of the "Ku Ku" tune on opening titles. The original version of the film also is not available for viewing and survives only in a censored 1937 re-release print which had pre-Code sequences removed (about one reel of material was cut). On that version, a background music track was added which was a mixture of a few Leroy Shield jazzy tunes and some music commonly used in 1937 Hal Roach films. Blotto is the only Laurel and Hardy film in which Laurel's character is married while Hardy's isn't.

Although the original 1930 version is now considered a lost film, a Spanish language version produced by MGM, entitled La Vida Nocturna has survived which shows how the film was originally presented, including a gag involving an electric fan after Stan says he needs some "fresh air". This is not available in the English version due to negative damage.

International versions
The film was reshot and entitled La Vida Nocturna for the Spanish language market.

References

External links
 
 
 
 

1930 films
1930 comedy films
American black-and-white films
Films directed by James Parrott
Laurel and Hardy (film series)
Metro-Goldwyn-Mayer short films
Films with screenplays by H. M. Walker
American comedy short films
Films scored by Nathaniel Shilkret
1930s English-language films
1930s American films